Joana Nnazua Kolo (born in 1993) is a humanitarian and the youngest serving Commissioner for Youth and Sports Development in Nigeria's Kwara State. At 26, she is believed to be the youngest commissioner in the history of Nigeria. She was a 2018 graduate of Library Science of Kwara State University, Kwara State.

Joana Nnazua was nominated two weeks before the completion of her National Youths Service Corps (NYSC) programme early October 2019, in Jigawa State, where she taught at Model Boarding Junior Secondary School Guri.

In 2020, Joana was listed as one of the "Top 100 Most Influential Women" by Guardian Newspaper, through her humanitarian, community development and advocacy for good governance as the youngest commissioner in Nigeria.

References

1993 births
Living people
Kwara State politicians
Kwara State University alumni
21st-century Nigerian women politicians
21st-century Nigerian politicians
Nigerian humanitarians
Women humanitarians
Commissioners of state ministries in Nigeria